Riding the Storm is a compilation album from the band Running Wild. The album was released on May 20, 2016, by Noise Records as a 2-CD set with a total of 32 songs. The compilation features material from the albums Gates to Purgatory right up to Masquerade while the band was signed to Noise Records.

Track listing

Personnel
Rolf Kasparek – vocals, guitars, Production 
Majk Moti – guitars
Axl Morgan – guitars
Thilo Herrmann guitars
Stephan Boriss – bass
Jens Becker – bass
Thomas Smuszynski – bass
Stefan Schwarzmann – drums
Iain Finlay – drums
Jörg Michael – drums

References 

2016 compilation albums
Noise Records compilation albums